Juan Bosch may refer to:

 Juan Bosch (politician) (1909–2001), Dominican politician and the first democratically elected president of the Dominican Republic
 Juan Bosch bridge, named after him
 Juan Bosch metro station, named after him
 Juan Bosch (film director) (1925–2015), Spanish film director and screenwriter